Arthur Ngirakelsong (born 1941 or 1942) was chief justice of the Supreme Court of Palau from 1992 to 2020.

Ngirakelsong was educated at Rutgers University in the United States of America, graduating in 1974 with a Doctor of Jurisprudence. from 1976 he worked as an attorney for the staff of the Congress of Micronesia in the Trust Territory of the Pacific Islands. He began his judicial career as an associate justice of the Supreme Court of Palau in 1986. He became Chief Justice in 1992, following the death of Mamoru Nakamura. He resigned from the position on 1 June 2020.

References

Palauan judges
Living people
Rutgers University alumni
Year of birth missing (living people)